North Londonderry was a United Kingdom Parliament constituency in Ireland.

Boundaries and boundary changes
North Londonderry was a county constituency, officially titled the North Derry division of County Londonderry. It extent was unchanged throughout its existence, comprising the northern part of County Londonderry, defined as follows: 
 four complete baronies, namely, Keenaght, the North East Liberties of Coleraine, the North West Liberties of Londonderry, and Tirkeeran;
 and part of the barony of Coleraine, comprising
 four complete civil parishes, namely, Dunboe, Formoyle, Killowen and Macosquin;
 and part of the civil parish of Aghadowey; namely, the townlands of Ballinrees, Ballybritain, Ballycaghan, Ballyclough, Ballydevitt, Ballylintagh, Ballymenagh, Ballynacally Beg, Ballynacally More, Ballywillin, Clintagh, Collins, Craigmore, Crevolea, Craiglea Glebe, Crosscanley Glebe, Crossmakeever, Culdrum, Drumatemple, Glencurb, Keely, Killeague, Kiltest, Knockaduff, Lisnamuck, Managher, Mayboy, Meavemanougher, Meencraig, Moneybrannon, Mullan, Scalty and Shanlongford.

The constituency returned one Member of Parliament. Prior to the 1885 United Kingdom general election and after the dissolution of Parliament in 1922 the area was part of the Londonderry constituency.

Politics
The constituency was a predominantly unionist area. Sinn Féin was easily beaten in 1918 and 1919.

The First Dáil
Sinn Féin contested the general election of 1918 on the platform that instead of taking up any seats they won in the United Kingdom Parliament, they would establish a revolutionary assembly in Dublin. In republican theory every MP elected in Ireland was a potential Deputy to this assembly. In practice only the Sinn Féin members accepted the offer.

The revolutionary First Dáil assembled on 21 January 1919 and last met on 10 May 1921. The First Dáil, according to a resolution passed on 10 May 1921, was formally dissolved on the assembling of the Second Dáil. This took place on 16 August 1921.

In 1921 Sinn Féin decided to use the UK authorised elections for the Northern Ireland House of Commons and the House of Commons of Southern Ireland as a poll for the Irish Republic's Second Dáil. This area, in republican theory, was incorporated in a five-member Dáil constituency of Londonderry.

Members of Parliament

Elections
The elections in this constituency took place using the first past the post electoral system.

Elections in the 1880s

Elections in the 1890s

Elections in the 1900s

Elections in the 1910s

Anderson resigns, prompting a by-election.

Elections in the 1920s
Barrie dies, prompting a by-election.

References

Redistribution of Seats Act, Seventh Schedule, Part III - Ireland, in The Public General Acts of the United Kingdom of Great Britain and Ireland passed in the forty-eighth and forty-ninth years of Her Majesty Queen Victoria

External links
 Dáil Éireann Members Database Houses of the Oireachtas
 Dáil Debates - Díospóireachtaí Dála Houses of the Oireachtas
 Redistribution of Seats Act, Seventh Schedule - Part III - Ireland, County of Londonderry Redistribution of Seats Act, 1885 (from Internet Archive)

See also
 List of UK Parliament Constituencies in Ireland and Northern Ireland
 Redistribution of Seats (Ireland) Act 1918
 List of MPs elected in the 1918 United Kingdom general election
 List of Dáil Éireann constituencies in Ireland (historic)
 Members of the 1st Dáil

North Londonderry
Dáil constituencies in Northern Ireland (historic)
Constituencies of the Parliament of the United Kingdom established in 1885
Constituencies of the Parliament of the United Kingdom disestablished in 1922